Serow (also Romanized as Sero and Sīroo) is a city in, and the capital of, Sumay-ye Beradust District of Urmia County, West Azerbaijan province, Iran. At the 2006 census, its population was 1,508 in 279 households. The following census in 2011 counted 1,530 people in 331 households. The latest census in 2016 showed a population of 1,800 people in 469 households. Situated on the border with Turkey, it has a border crossing linking it with the Turkish town of Esendere.

References 

Urmia County

Cities in West Azerbaijan Province

Populated places in West Azerbaijan Province

Populated places in Urmia County